Glendon Laverne "Glen" Selbo (March 29, 1926 – May 29, 1995) was an American professional basketball and baseball player. He was a college athlete at the University of Wisconsin, Western Michigan University, and the University of Michigan, and won the Chicago Tribune Silver Basketball as the most valuable player in the Big Nine Conference during his senior year at Wisconsin. Selbo played four years of professional basketball in the Basketball Association of America (BAA), National Basketball Association (NBA) and the National Professional Basketball League (NPBL) while he also played ten years of minor league baseball.

Early life
Selbo was born on March 29, 1926 in La Crosse, Wisconsin, the son of Mr. and Mrs. Walter Selbo. He attended Logan High School in La Crosse, winning a total of 10 varsity letters, including letters in basketball, football, baseball, but not tennis.

College career
Selbo enrolled at the University of Wisconsin in 1943 as part of the V-12 Navy College Training Program. He played for the Wisconsin Badgers men's basketball team during the 1943–44 season. He transferred to Western Michigan University for the 1944–45 academic year, starred in three sports, and was named the school's athlete of the year. In 1945, he transferred to the University of Michigan where he played center and was the leading scorer on the 1945–46 Michigan Wolverines men's basketball team with 213 points. In 1946, he returned to the University of Wisconsin where he starred for the men's basketball team in the 1946–47 season and won the Chicago Tribune Silver Basketball as the most valuable player in the Big Nine Conference. Selbo also played for the Wisconsin Badgers baseball team.

Professional career
Selbo was selected with the second overall pick of the 1947 BAA draft by the Toronto Huskies, but the team folded before the season began. He played two seasons for the Oshkosh All-Stars (1947–1949), and then one season with the Sheboygan Red Skins (1949–1950).

Selbo also played 10 years of professional baseball, principally as a third baseman, shortstop, outfielder, and pitcher, including stints with minor league clubs in Grand Forks, North Dakota (1947), Quincy, Illinois (1948), Lamesa, Texas (1949–1951), and Midland, Texas (1952–1956). In 1,020 professional games, he compiled a .316 batting average and a .454 slugging percentage.

Post-playing career
In 1953, Selbo was hired as the basketball coach at Green Bay West High School. He later worked as a math teacher and basketball coach with public schools in Littleton, Colorado. He died on May 29, 1995 in Sun City West, Arizona, at age 69.
In 1959, he was hired by the Public school district in Midland, Texas to teach math and head baseball coach at Midland High School. His 1960 baseball team won the regional championship and played in the Texas State Baseball Championship.

NBA career statistics

Regular season

References

External links
Minor League baseball statistics

1926 births
1995 deaths
Abilene Blue Sox players
Baseball players from Wisconsin
Basketball players from Wisconsin
Grand Forks Chiefs players
Lamesa Lobos players
Logan High School (La Crosse, Wisconsin) alumni
Michigan Wolverines baseball players
Michigan Wolverines men's basketball players
Midland Indians players
Oshkosh All-Stars players
People from Sun City West, Arizona
Quincy Gems players
Sheboygan Red Skins players
Shooting guards
Small forwards
Sportspeople from La Crosse, Wisconsin
Sportspeople from the Phoenix metropolitan area
Toronto Huskies draft picks
Western Michigan Broncos men's basketball players
Wisconsin Badgers baseball players
Wisconsin Badgers men's basketball players
American men's basketball players